Twins is the debut studio album by English neoclassical dark wave and martial industrial band In the Nursery, released in September 1986 by Sweatbox Records.

Critical reception

In a retrospective review for AllMusic, critic Ned Raggett wrote of the album, "the Humberstones take a notable step forward from rock aesthetics to a much more elaborate, involved kind of music", concluding that "Twins remains an underrated, fascinating album."

Track listing

Personnel
Credits are adapted from the Twins liner notes.

In the Nursery
Gus Ferguson – cello
Klive Humberstone – instruments, vocals
Nigel Humberstone – instruments, vocals
Elaine McLeod – vocals

Production and artwork
Chris Bigg – design
Mark Estdale – engineering
In the Nursery – production
Nimbus – mastering
SNAKE – production
Bill Stephenson – photography

References

External links
 

1986 debut albums
In the Nursery albums